Swainson is a family name of English origin.  It may refer to:

People
 Charles Swainson (naturalist), (1841-1913), Rector of High Hurst Wood and later of Old Charlton, author of books on birds, weather and folk-lore
Charles Anthony Swainson (1820–1887), English theologian
 Gina Swainson (born 1958), Bermudan first runner-up in the 1979 Miss Universe contest
 Isaac Swainson (1746–1812), English patent medicine entrepreneur
 John Swainson (1925–1994), American politician 
 William John Swainson (1789–1855), English naturalist
 William Swainson (lawyer) (1809–1884), English lawyer

Places
 The Swainson Island Group, which includes Swainson Island, Tasmania, Australia

Biology
Birds
 Swainson's flycatcher, Myiarchus swainsoni
 Swainson's francolin, or Francolinus swainsonii
 Swainson's hawk, Buteo swainsoni
 Swainson's sparrow, Passer swainsonii
 Swainson's thrush, Catharus ustulatus
 Swainson's warbler, Limnothlypis swainsonii

Butterflies
 Swainson's crow, Euploea swainson

Plants
 Swainsona, large genus of flowering plants native to Australia